Tilka Majhi was an Indian freedom fighter the first Adivasi leader from Santal Community. He took up arms against the British in the 1784, around 70 years before Mangal Pandey. He organized the Adivasis to form an armed group to fight against the resource grabbing and exploitation of British.

History 
In 1784, the first armed rebellion occurred against the British, and was the beginning of Santal. It was due to great famine in 1770 and the consequences of Court of Directors order influenced by William Pitt the Younger—Court of Director issued ten year of the settlement of Zamindari and later in 1800 - this resulted in minimum chance to negotiate between local Zamdindars and Santhal villagers. Baba Tilka Majhi attacked Augustus Cleveland, British commissioner [lieutenant], and Rajmahal with a Gulel (a weapon similar to slingshot) who died later. The British surrounded the Tilapore forest from which he operated but he and his men held them at bay for several weeks. When he was finally caught in 1784, he was tied to the tail of a horse and dragged all the way to the collector's residence at Bhagalpur, Bihar, India. There, his lacerated body was hung from a Banyan tree.

A statue to him was erected at the spot where he was hanged, after Indian independence, which is the nearby residence of S.P. Bhagalpur and named after him. Also, the Bhagalpur University was renamed after him - Tilka Manjhi Bhagalpur University.

References 

1784 deaths
18th-century Indian people
People from Bihar
Indian rebels
1750 births